Lindiwe Daphney Zulu  (born 21 April 1958) is South Africa's Minister of Social Development.

She was the special advisor to the President on International Relations. She previously served as the head of communication for the PAN African women's organisation in Angola in 1988. In 1989 she moved to Lusaka, Zambia where she held the position of head of communication in the ANC department of Religious Affairs. In 1990 she moved to Uganda where she was the head of communication and administrator in the ANC office. In 1991 she returned to South Africa and became the head of communication in the ANC Women's League.

She was elected to the ANC Department of Information and Publicity as the spokesperson for the first democratic elections. In 1994 she became a member of the Gauteng Legislature and in 1995 was appointed Deputy Speaker of the Gauteng Legislature. In 1999 she was the special advisor to the Minister of Foreign Affairs. In 2001 she was appointed Chief Director for Western and Central Africa up until 2003 where she became the executive head of Government and International Relations, Vodacom group. In 2004 she became the South African Ambassador to Brazil. In 2007 she was elected to the ANC national executive committee. In 2009 Ms Zulu was elected to Parliament as an MP in the National Assembly. She currently serves as the Minister of Social Development.

Early life
Zulu was born on 21 April 1958 in the village of Nhlazatshe, Eastern Transvaal (now Mpumalanga); however the village was razed to the ground during Apartheid. The villagers was forced to set up new homes in Madadeni, Newcastle which was in the KwaZulu bantustan. Zulu's parents though, moved their family to Swaziland as her mother is a Swazi from Gege. She was educated at St. Theresa's and Mjingo schools before attending the Swaziland Cooperative Development College in Ezulwini. She then joined the African National Congress and went into exile in Mozambique.

Life in exile
Zulu attended the Solomon Mahlangu Freedom College, SOMAFCO, in Mazimbu, Tanzania before gaining a scholarship to study journalism in the USSR. She spent seven years in Moscow, achieving a master's degree in Journalism and fluency in Russian. In 1987 she went to Angola for full military training with the Pan Africanist Women's Organisation.

Return to South Africa
Zulu returned from exile in 1992 to become head of communications in the ANC Women's League. She then became an executive committee member in 1993. In 1993 she was seconded to the ANC's department of information and publicity as the spokesperson for the elections. In 1994 she joined the Gauteng Provincial Legislature and was appointed Deputy Speaker in 1995. From 1999 to 2001 she was a special advisor to the Minister of Foreign Affairs. From 2001 to 2003 she was Chief Director for western and central Africa in the Department of Foreign Affairs. In 2004 she was posted to Brazil as South African Ambassador for four and a half years. Since 2009 she has been an ANC Member of Parliament. In 2013 she was appointed to the National Working Committee of the ANC. Since 2014 she has held the position of Minister of Small Business Development. In 2018 she was cleared of lying about the purchase of ministerial cars which it was alleged had cost R3.1m amount, but had in fact cost R1.8m.

Personal life
Zulu has four children: daughters Nokuthula and Phindile, and sons Sipho and Boitumelo. Zulu is married to Kgosietsile Itholeng, a fellow South African in exile, whom she met in Angola. Her son, Sipho, is named after her father. Her brother was a member of the Pan African Congress.

References

1958 births
Living people
Government ministers of South Africa
Women government ministers of South Africa
African National Congress politicians
20th-century South African women politicians
20th-century South African politicians
21st-century South African women politicians
21st-century South African politicians
Members of the National Assembly of South Africa
Women members of the National Assembly of South Africa
People from Mpumalanga